NGC 3686 is a spiral galaxy that forms with three other spiral galaxies, NGCs 3681, 3684, and 3691, a quartet of galaxies in the Leo constellation. It was discovered on 14 March 1784 by William Herschel. It is a member of the NGC 3607 Group of galaxies, which is a member of the Leo II Groups, a series of galaxies and galaxy clusters strung out from the right edge of the Virgo Supercluster.

References

External links 
 

Leo (constellation)
3686
17840314
Barred spiral galaxies
035268